Galehban (also Romanized as Galehbān and Gallehbān; also known as Kalehbān, Kyāliāvan, and Kyalyavan) is a village in Zolbin Rural District, Yamchi District, Marand County, East Azerbaijan Province, Iran. At the 2006 census, its population was 3,042, in 703 families.

References 

Populated places in Marand County